Hamara Desh is a Bollywood film. It was released in 1941. It starred Jani Babu.

References

External links
 

1941 films
1940s Hindi-language films
Indian action comedy films
Indian black-and-white films
1940s action comedy films
1941 comedy films